Earthquakes in 2007 resulted in many fatalities. The 2007 Peru earthquake was the deadliest with 595 fatalities. The September 2007 Sumatra earthquake was the largest in 2007 with an 8.4 on the moment magnitude scale. The 2007 Solomon Islands earthquake caused a significant tsunami that killed 52 people. There were four 8.0+ earthquakes in 2007 which is the most ever recorded for a single year. Other significant earthquakes in 2007 struck Chile and Japan.

Compared to other years

Overall

By death toll

 Note: At least 10 dead

By magnitude

 Note: At least 7.0 Magnitude

By month

January

About 130 houses were destroyed and a mining complex were damaged in Isfana. At least 57 buildings were damaged in Vorukh.
Around 2,000 buildings were damaged in the epicenter area.
Several buildings collapsed in the epicentral area.
This was a doublet of the 2006 Kuril Islands earthquake.
 A magnitude 6.2 earthquake the South Sandwich Islands On January 20 at a depth of 10.0 km (6.2 mi).
 A magnitude 7.5 earthquake struck Ternate, Indonesia on January 21 at a depth of 20.0 km (12.4 mi). Four people were killed and minor damage was caused in Manado.
Two people were injured and some damage to old buildings was reported in Ağrı.
 A magnitude 6.6 earthquake struck The Northern Mariana Islands on January 30 at a depth of 20.0 km (12.4 mi).

February

 A magnitude 6.2 earthquake struck Lucea, Jamaica on February 4 at a depth of 10.0 km (6.2 mi).
 A magnitude 6.2 earthquake struck the Iberian Peninsula, Portugal on February 12 at a depth of 20.0 km (12.4 mi).
Minor damage was caused to an apartment in Davao City.
Some buildings were damaged in Elazığ, and Pütürge. 

March 

Nine people were injured, eight buildings were destroyed and 63 damaged in Caqueta.
A tsunami up to 16 cm Was Observed.
One person was killed, 359 people were injured, and 13,556 buildings damaged or destroyed, as well as a tsunami up to 22 cm high.
Some buildings were damaged and rockslides occurred in Argostolion.

April 

 A magnitude 6.9 earthquake struck Panguna, Papua New Guinea on April 1 at a depth of 10.0 km (6.2 mi).
 A magnitude 6.1 earthquake struck Sinabang, Indonesia on April 7 at a depth of 30.0 km (18.6 mi).
 A magnitude 6.0 earthquake struck the Balleny Islands on April 12 at a depth of 10.0 km (6.2 mi).
 A magnitude 6.4 earthquake struck Macquarie Island on April 16, at a depth of 10.0 km (6.2 mi).

May 

 A magnitude 6.1 earthquake struck Xizang, China on May 5 at a depth of 9.0 km (5.6 mi). Some buildings were damaged in Tibet.
 A magnitude 6.1 earthquake struck Aisen, Chile on May 7 at a depth of 10.0 km (6.2 mi).
Some buildings were slightly damaged in Sheridan.
 A magnitude 6.3 earthquake struck Huay Xai, Laos on May 16 at a depth of 9.0 km (5.6 mi). Several buildings were damaged as far away as Thailand.

June 

 A magnitude 6.1 earthquake struck Jinghong, China on June 2 at a depth of 5.0 km (3.1 mi), 3 people were killed and 329 were injured.
Some buildings were damaged in Guatemala City. 
Some buildings were damaged slightly in Qom.
 A magnitude 6.5 earthquake struck the Mid-Atlantic Ridge on June 24 at a depth of 10.0 km (6.2 mi).

July 

Some damage to houses was caused in Zaruma.
 A magnitude 6.6 earthquake struck Chūetsu, Japan on July 16 at a depth of 10.0 km (6.2 mi). Eleven people were killed, more than 1,000 were injured and a minor tsunami was triggered.
 A magnitude 5.6 earthquake struck Xinjiang, China on July 20 at a depth of 10.0 km (6.2 mi). At least 2,120 houses and four bridges were damaged or destroyed.
 A magnitude 5.2 earthquake struck Rasht, Tajikistan on July 21 at a depth of 10.0 km (6.2 mi). 12 people were killed, three by falling debris, nine by a landslide.
Three people were injured and several buildings were damaged. Rockslides also occurred.
Around 5 people were injured.

August 

Some roads, buildings and a bridge were damaged in Luganville. A policeman suffered injuries while evacuating.
Two people were killed, twelve people were injured and a  tsunami was observed in Hokkaido, Japan. A magnitude 4.9 aftershock injured two more people.
Some damage was caused in Sukabumi, such as cracks on walls. In the same regency, the walls of two schools collapsed. 
Slight damage was observed in Satara.
 A magnitude 5.0 earthquake struck Hormozgan, Iran on August 25 at a depth of 10.0 km (6.2 mi). Four people were injured in Bandar Abbas.

September 

At least one building was damaged in Lotung.
Five people were injured.
This was an aftershock of the 8.4 earthquake the day before.
This was an aftershock of the 8.4 earthquake the day before.
This Was an Aftershock of the 8.4 earthquake 8 days prior.
 A magnitude 7.4 earthquake struck the Auckland Islands on September 30 at a depth of 10.0 km (6.2 mi).

October 

Minor damage occurred at San Jose.

November

One person died, five were injured and several buildings were damaged or collapsed in Talala. 
One person died in Mabini.
Ten people were injured and minor damage was caused.
Two people were killed and 20 people were injured. A tsunami up to 25.5 cm was also triggered.
Slight damage was caused in Guayaquil.
. Thirty people were injured and slight damage was caused. 
A water tower was damaged and power was knocked out in Lae.
Electricity and communications were disrupted at Baguio.

December 

One person died and 6 others were injured.
Four people were injured at Viña del Mar and several buildings damaged in Valparaiso.
Power and communications were disrupted throughout the epicentral area from Antofagasta to Iquique.
One person died of a heart attack and 11 others were injured.
 A magnitude 5.7 earthquake struck Ankara, Turkey on December 20 at a depth of 10.0 km (6.2 mi). A minaret and other buildings collapsed at Yeniyapan and a mosque and animal shelters were damaged at Abazlar. Mud brick houses and masonry structures were damaged at Sirapinar. Shelters collapsed at Suyuguzel and killed about 100 animals. Slight damage occurred in Ankara.  

See also
 List of 21st-century earthquakes

References

2007
2007